Polyommatus barmifiruze is a butterfly in the family Lycaenidae. It was described by Frédéric Carbonell in 2000. It is found in Iran.

References

Butterflies described in 2000
Polyommatus
Butterflies of Asia